"Body and Soul" is the 153rd episode of Star Trek: Voyager, the seventh episode of the seventh season. This television episode is one installment of a science fiction series involving a spacecraft trying to get back to Earth from the other side of the Galaxy. The show aired on the United Paramount Network on November 15, 2000. It is focused especially on two characters, Seven of Nine (a former Borg drone) and the holographic medical program called the Doctor (played by Jeri Ryan and Robert Picardo respectively). The episode was noted for its humor and acting performances in reception.

Plot

The Delta Flyer, occupied by Seven of Nine, the Doctor, and Ensign Harry Kim, are intercepted by a ship from the Lokirrin species. The Lokirrin's captain, Ranek, accuses the Doctor of being a "photonic insurgent" and threatens to decompile his program. Ranek has his men board the Delta Flyer but they only find Seven and Kim; the two are captured and taken to the Lokirrim brig. There, Seven secretly reveals to Kim that she is really the Doctor, Seven having allowed him to download his program into her Borg implants. The Doctor, in control of Seven's body, begins to experience human senses for the first time. Though not immediately taken by what he can smell, he's certainly delighted by what he can taste, quickly indulging in a healthy appetite.

Ranek brings Seven, still possessed by the Doctor, to the Delta Flyer for her to explain the purpose of the food replicator, fearing it can produce bioweapons. The Doctor, as Seven, uses the replicator to synthesize human delicacies which both he and Ranek greatly enjoy. Eventually, the Doctor is able to get Ranek drunk, allowing him to get the holo-emitter before he is returned to the brig. There, the Doctor transfers himself to the emitter, and Seven, now in possession of herself, bitterly complains to the Doctor about his misuse of her body, with copious amounts of cheesecake and numerous glasses of wine. The Doctor apologizes when it becomes clear that they will need to continue to have the Doctor inhabit Seven's body to engineer their escape.

Ranek begins to allow Seven more leeway on his ship, including helping in their medical bay. Ranek shows signs of affection for the personality Seven displays from the Doctor's influence, including surprising him/her with a kiss, which sends the doc into a panic. A little later, while Seven is being massaged to work out a muscle spasm, the Doctor experience sexual arousal. When Seven is returned to the brig and the Doctor transferred to the mobile emitter, he and Seven get into an argument: Seven is infuriated about how the Doctor is using her body, while the Doctor complains that Seven does not let herself experience these sensations and emotions, telling Seven they are what make life worth living. Kim calms them down, and Seven does reveal that while the Doctor was in control of her body, she still could evaluate the ship's systems towards their escape.

Seven allows the Doctor to use her body again, this time to lure Ranek to the Delta Flyer for a distracting date. The Doctor is able to sedate Ranek while they are dancing a waltz, and uses the opportunity to contact Voyager. When Ranek wakes, he demands Seven be brought to him, but by then, Voyager has arrived and Captain Janeway demands the return of her crew. Ranek attempts to use shields to prevent Voyager from taking its crew back, but injures himself in the process.

The Doctor downloads himself back into his mobile emitter to stay behind to help treat Ranek, telling him it was he all along and that not all photonic beings are villainous. Ranek is visibly rattled when he discovers it was the male doctor he had kissed before. The Doctor is returned safely to Voyager, where later he and Seven enjoy a meal, which he enviously senses vicariously through Seven's descriptions of it. Seven pours a glass of wine and toasts the Doc "to shared experiences".

In a side plot, Tuvok secretly informs Tom Paris that he is suffering from pon farr. Paris suggests he can program the holodeck to recreate Tuvok's wife T'Pel, and though Tuvok is initially wary, agrees it is the best course of action. During this program, the Lorikkin scans disrupt the holodeck, leaving Tuvok still suffering. He manages to regain his senses to help Voyager recover its missing crew, but later completes his holodeck treatment and thanks Paris for his help.

Production

"Body and Soul" was one of four episodes of Star Trek: Voyager to be directed by cast member Robert Duncan McNeill, who portrays Tom Paris in the series. He liked the story itself, and praised the guest stars Megan Gallagher and Fritz Sperberg. He said that "I just had such fun on that. It was a real treat." Specifically of Jeri Ryan's performance, he said that she did a "great job" in duplicating the mannerisms of Robert Picardo; "Jeri nailed Bob's gestures, his eye rolls, everything." He also felt that the comedy in the episode translated to viewers who were not necessarily fans of the show but that Ryan's performance added an extra layer for fans.

Gallagher had previously appeared twice in Star Trek: Deep Space Nine prior to her Voyager appearance, first in the episode "Invasive Procedures" and then in the fan favourite "Little Green Men". She was visiting her husband Jeff Yagher on the set of the Voyager episode "Flesh and Blood", and was asked by Merri Howard if she was free to appear in the series as Howard and McNeill were preparing for "Body and Soul" at the time. She was not required to audition, and instead was cast as Lt. Jaryn for the episode.

Reception

In 2012, Den of Geek listed this as an honorable mention for their ranking of the top ten episodes of Star Trek: Voyager.

In 2017, this was ranked as one of the funniest Star Trek episodes of the franchise. They also praised actress Jeri Ryan's acting performance as the uploaded EMH personality with such lines as enjoying cheesecake.

In 2019, CBR noted this episode as one of the top 20 funniest episodes of the Star Trek franchise, which at the time included more than 700 installments. They stated "Ryan and Picardo are obviously having pure fun with this...", especially remarking how Jeri Ryan impersonated the other character, which due to the story's plot elements had been uploaded to her cybernetic storage.

Home media releases 
On December 21, 2003, this episode was released on DVD as part of a Season 7 boxset; Star Trek Voyager: Complete Seventh Season.

References

External links

 

Star Trek: Voyager (season 7) episodes
2000 American television episodes